Hont-Pázmány (Hunt-Poznan) was the name of a gens ("clan") in the Kingdom of Hungary. The Gesta Hunnorum et Hungarorummentions that the ancestors of the family, the brothers Hont (Hunt) and Pázmány (Pazman), originally from the Duchy of Swabia in the Holy Roman Empire, arrived in the late 10th century to the court of Grand Prince Géza of the Magyars:

The next arrivals were Hunt and Pazman, two half-brothers, courageous knights of Swabian origin. These two and their retainers had been journeying through Hungary with the intention of passing over the sea when they were detained by Duke Géza, and finally they girded King Stephen with the sword of knighthood at the river Hron, after the German custom.

The clan Hontpaznan was mentioned for the first time in 1226 in a charter. Several prominent families of the kingdom (e.g., Szentgyörgyi and Forgách) descended from the gens.

Based on the use of the coat of arms, it is suspected that the Hunyadi family also came from the genus Hontpázmány.

Bonfini [in: Mátyás király, Tíz könyv a magyar történetből (Magyar Helikon, Budapest, 1959)] recorded the family tradition that the Hunyadis came from Italy ("from the Romans"), more precisely: from the Lacedaemonians who founded a colony in Italy. It is well known that the only Spartan-founded colony was Taras (present-day Taranto) in southern Apulia.

The haplotype of Hunyadi Y-DNA has long been known but has not been published. If it matched the Honpázmány’s (as Serbian researchers had already guessed in 2019), it would rehabilitate the much-scolded Bonfini as well.

The Y-chromosomal DNA haplogroup [E1b1b1a1b1a6a1c (E-BY4281)] of the last two male members of the Hunyadi family (published: Heliyon, November 16, 2022) shows a match with the YDNA of the Hontpázmány genus.

The branches of the clan
By the 13th century, the clan divided into 12 branches:
the branch of Bozók held possessions in Hont County and they had two castles;
the possessions of the branch of Födémes (now Ipeľské Úľany) were located in Hont and Borsod counties and their castle in Borsod County was built without royal authorization and therefore, it was demolished in 1298; 
the members of the branch of Bény owned lands in Hont and Nyitra counties and they held three castles;
the branch of Csalomja (today Malá Čalomija) held possessions in Hont county;
the lands of the members of the branch of Gímes (now Jelenec) were located in Nitra County and they had a castle built there;
the branch of Szeg possessed lands in Nitra County;
the members of the branch of Szentgyörgy and Cseklész (today Bernolákovo) held possessions in Prešporok County and they had three castles by the end of the 13th century;
the possessions of the branch Pogány of Garadna were located in Trencsén county;
the members of the branch of Újhely owned lands in Bihar County where they had a castle built;
the branch Pázmány of Panasz held possessions in Bihar County;
the members of the branch of Beszterce owned lands in Bihar County;
the possessions of the branch of Czibak-Batthyányi were also located in Bihar County.

Notable members of the clan
The first notable members of the clan were the brothers Hont and Pázmány who assisted Géza's son, the future King Stephen I of Hungary against his relative, the pagan Koppány who claimed for Géza's inheritance. The deed of foundation of the Pannonhalma Archabbey (issued in 1001) referred to both brothers as the king's military leaders (duces). The brothers were granted possessions on the north-western parts of the kingdom (primarily in present-day Slovakia). Hont County was named after one of them.

The divergence of opinions about the origin of the Hontpázmány genus is caused by the fact that Simon Kézai exchanged the place of origin of the Rátót genus (Swabia) with the Hontpázmány’s (Apulia) in the Gesta Hungarorum, and it is seldom possible to reach a stable conclusion from an erroneous starting point.

In his work entitled „A magyar nemzetségek a XIV. század közepéig” (The Hungarian genera until the middle of the 14th century) (Hungarian scientific Academy, Budapest, 1900) János Karácsonyi considers Kézai's statement to be incredible. According to him, the Hontpázmány genus was of Italian origin. By reason, the Hontpázmány's place of origin was Apulia.

Mark Kálti's pictorial chronicle corrects Kézai in part because it does not name the place of origin of Hontpázmánys and does not claim that they were brothers. It is even more striking that the painter of the miniatures depicted Hontpázmány as a single person.

The coat of arms of the Hontpázmány family is pictorially identical to the symbol of medieval Byzantium, which Stefan Lochner also painted on the altarpiece of Cologne Cathedral. Apulia at that time, as part of the Contea Puglia e Calabria, belonged to the Byzantine Empire. The county became a duchy only in August 1059 (Ducato Puglia e Calabria).

According to the early forms in diplomas (Poznano and Paznan), the name and title of the incoming Pázmány could have been "Conte Panzano".

By perceiving the last letter "o" of the word "Panzano" as a Latin object conjugation and omitting it, and interpreting the last letter "e" of the word "conte" as a word "and" and separating it, with some exchanges of sound, the “Chont e Paznan” brothers could be produced.

Metamorphosis was aided by two factors too. One was that the title “conte” was unknown in contemporary Hungarian practice. This occurred in the material of the Hungarian National Archives only in 1309 and 1421 (DL-DF 230265 and DL-DF 98010), but not in Hungarian relation. The other factor was that the name of the contemporary Polish capital, Poznan, was better known and easier to pronounce in Hungarian – so the form "Poznano" (instead "Panzano") appears in the founding deed of Pannonhalma Abbey and in several deeds around 1220.

Lampert (?–1132) founded the Abbey of Bozók. His first wife was the sister of King Ladislaus I of Hungary. He held about 30 possessions and thus he was one of the wealthiest landowners of the kingdom. In 1124, he took part in the campaign of King Stephen II of Hungary against Dalmatia. Lampert was murdered by the followers of King Béla II the Blind, because he was suspected of supporting Boris Kalamanos's claim to the throne.

Around 1201, Martin (?–1236/1245) held the office of count (comes) at the court of the future King Andrew II of Hungary, and served as the Ban of Croatia and Dalmatia. In 1202 and between 1212-1213, Martin was the Ban of Slavonia and he was styled Ban also in 1224 and 1234. In 1214, he held the office of judge royal (országbíró).  He founded the Abbey of Ipolyság (today Šahy in Slovakia).

Achilles (b. 1210–1252) was bishop of Pécs between 1251 and 1252.

Lampert (of the branch of Csalomja) was bishop of Eger from 1247 to 1275.

Ivánka II from the Szeg branch was Judge royal sometime before 1289.

Gímes branch
Andrew I was a confidant of Béla IV of Hungary. He erected the castles of Gímes (Jelenec) and Turóc (Zniev). His sons were John, archbishop of Kalocsa from 1278 to 1301, and Thomas III, an influential baron. Both were strong partisans of King Andrew III of Hungary. Another sons were Andrew II and Ivánka III, who were killed by Matthew III Csák.

Alternate theory on their origin

Some modern authors suggest that the clan Hont-Poznany was formed by intermarriages of two separate families, the Hunts and the Poznans ("Pázmánys", "Posnans") when the latter's male line died out in the mid-12th century. They claim that the ancestors both of the two families were already nobles at the time of Great Moravia and preserved their possessions after the incorporation of their territories into the arising Hungarian state. The theory suggests that they kept their Christian faith during the 10th century and its followers claim that the foundation deed of the Benedictine monastery of Bzovík proves that hereditary estates from the time before the arrival of the Magyars prevailed in the Hunts' property. The Pázmánys oversaw the Benedictine monastery below Zobor hill near Nitra and became its secular patrons. According to the theory, the seat of the Hunt family was the Hont castle and they ruled in the Central Ipeľ region in today's southern Slovakia, while the Pázmánys ruled in the region of today's north western Slovakia in the 10th century. Both families acknowledged the sovereignty of Michael of the House of Árpád and thus they became nobles at his court in Nitra. After Michael's death, the new ruler, Vajk (Stephen I) and the local nobility, spearheaded by the Pázmány and Hunt houses, developed very close personal ties and while fighting the Koppány rebellion in 997, Stephen took shelter with Pázmány and Hunt  ("Poznano" and "Cuntio"); they in turn added their troops to the retinue of Stephen's Bavarian wife Giselle. The united forces then defeated Koppány, making Stephen the sole ruler of the emerging  Hungarian state. In the 11th and 12th century the Hunts owned estates mainly in the county of Hont and along the Ipeľ river. By  the 11th and 12th centuries the Pázmáns' estates were mainly in the valley of the Nitra river. According to the alternate theory, the Pázmáns' male line died out in the mid-12th century; allied by marriage to the Hunts, the line became "Hont-Pázmány".

The oldest genealogic data about the Poznans are preserved in the Zobor charters (1111-1113). The charters contain names at least of fourth nobles from the Poznan family - Una, Bacha (Bača) and two sons of Bukven - Deda (Dedo) and Caca (Kačä). The high number of Slavic names in the Hunt-Poznan family is obvious until the 14th century (Stojslav, Vlk, Držislav, etc.).  The character of their hereditary property also indicates pre-Hungarian origin Naturally, those who belonged to the royal court or obtained property in Hungarian ethnic territories self-identified with the majority population in the area.

Notes

Sources
Fügedi, Erik: Ispánok, bárók, kiskirályok - a középkori magyar arisztokrácia fejlődése (Counts, Barons and Petty Kings - The Development of the Hungarian Medieval Aristocracy); Magvető Könyvkiadó, 1986, Budapest; .
Kristó, Gyula (editor): Korai Magyar Történeti Lexikon - 9-14. század (Encyclopedia of the Early Hungarian History - 9-14th centuries); Akadémiai Kiadó, 1994, Budapest; .
Kristó, Gyula: Néhány megjegyzés a magyar nemzetségekről (Some remarks on the Hungarian clans), in: Tanulmányok az Árpád-korról, pp. 26-50. (Studies on the Age of the Árpáds); Magvető Könyvkiadó, 1983, Budapest; .
Markó, László: A magyar állam főméltóságai Szent Istvántól napjainkig - Életrajzi Lexikon (The High Officers of the Hungarian State from Saint Stephen to the Present Days - A Biographical Encyclopedia); Magyar Könyvklub, 2000, Budapest; .
Ján Lukačka: Beginnings of the formation of Aristocracy on the territory of Slovakia (available online)
 
Lukačka, Ján. 2002. Formovanie vyššej šľachty na západnom Slovensku.
Ján Steinhübel: Nitrianske kniežatstvo [Nitrian principality], Veda, vydavateľstvo Slovenskej akadémie vied + Vydavateľstvo Rak, 2004, Bratislava [with several further Slovak and Hungarian genealogy and other references listed in the book]
Hunt-Pázmán in: Slovakia and the Slovaks - A concise encyclopaedia, Encyklopedical Institute of the Slovak Academy of Sciences, 1994

References